The Up! Tour was the second headlining concert tour by Canadian singer-songwriter Shania Twain in support of her fourth studio album Up! (2002). It began on September 25, 2003, in Hamilton, Ontario and finished on July 10, 2004, in Sunrise, Florida. The show reached North America and Europe. According to Billboard magazine, the tour grossed $87 million from 96 reported shows between 2003 and 2004.

Set list

2003
"Man! I Feel Like a Woman!"
"Up!"
"Honey, I'm Home"
"C'est la vie"
"Forever and for Always"
"I'm Not In The Mood (To Say No)!" 1
"She's Not Just a Pretty Face"
"Don't Be Stupid (You Know I Love You)"
"When You Kiss Me" 1
"Love Gets Me Every Time"
"Whose Bed Have Your Boots Been Under?"
"From This Moment On" 1
"No One Needs to Know" 1
"Thank You Baby! (for Makin' Someday Come So Soon)" 1
"The Woman in Me (Needs the Man in You)"
"That Don't Impress Me Much"
"What A Way To Wanna Be!"
Medley
"When"
"You Win My Love"
"Come on Over"
"I'm Holdin' on to Love (to Save My Life)"
"I'm Gonna Getcha Good!"
"Nah!" 1
"In My Car (I'll Be The Driver)"
"(If You're Not in It for Love) I'm Outta Here!"
Encore
"You're Still the One"
"Any Man of Mine"
"Rock This Country!"

2004
"Man! I Feel Like a Woman!"
"Up!"
"Honey, I'm Home"
"Don't Be Stupid (You Know I Love You)"
"Whose Bed Have Your Boots Been Under?"
"Forever and for Always"
"She's Not Just a Pretty Face"
"What A Way To Wanna Be!" 1
Medley
"When"
"You Win My Love"
"Come on Over"
"I'm Holdin' on to Love (to Save My Life)"
"The Woman in Me (Needs the Man in You)"
"That Don't Impress Me Much"
"I'm Gonna Getcha Good!"
"Nah!" 1
"You're Still the One"
"(If You're Not in It for Love) I'm Outta Here!"
Encore

1 Performed at select dates

"Man! I Feel Like a Woman!"
"Up!"
"Honey, I'm Home"
"C'est la vie"
"She's Not Just a Pretty Face"
"Don't Be Stupid (You Know I Love You)"
"When You Kiss Me"
"Whose Bed Have Your Boots Been Under?"
"Forever and for Always"
"Ka-Ching!"
"What A Way To Wanna Be!"
Medley
"When"
"You Win My Love"
"Come on Over"
"I'm Holdin' on to Love (to Save My Life)"
"Thank You Baby! (for Makin' Someday Come So Soon)"
"The Woman in Me (Needs the Man in You)"
"That Don't Impress Me Much"
"I'm Gonna Getcha Good!"
"In My Car (I'll Be The Driver)"
"(If You're Not in It for Love) I'm Outta Here!"
Encore

Tour dates

Personnel
 Shania Twain – lead vocals
 Brent Barcus – guitar
 J. D. Blair – drums
 Roddy Chong – fiddle, guitar, mandolin, percussion 
 Cory Churko – guitar, fiddle
 Allison Cornell – fiddle, keyboards, mandolin 
 Andy Cichon – bass guitar 
 Hardy Hemphill – keyboards, percussion, harmonica, accordion
 Marc Muller – pedal steel guitar
 Randall Waller – guitar

Broadcasts and recordings

Before the tour commenced, Twain performed a series of free concerts in the United States and a paid concert in the United Kingdom. The official DVD for the Up! Tour was filmed on July 27, 2003, at Grant Park in Chicago. The performance was shown on NBC and CBC in August 2003, with the DVD released in November 2003. The performances of  "She's Not Just a Pretty Face" and "It Only Hurts When I'm Breathing" were later used as music videos to promote the aforementioned singles. Up! Live in Chicago was certified platinum by the RIAA for shipments of over 500,000 copies in the United States. It was also certified platinum in Australia for shipments of 15,000 copies.

References

Shania Twain concert tours
2003 concert tours
2004 concert tours